Josetty Andrea Hurtado Huaytalla (born January 6, 1988) is a Peruvian actress and dancer known best for her role in the popular TV comedy sitcom "Mi Amor, el Wachimán" during Season's 2 and 3, produced by América Televisión. Hurtado's appearance on the show was received well enough for an appearance on El Gran Show 2013 (season 1), which was the international (Peru) version of America's Dancing with the Stars, by the same production company. Hurtado is the daughter of Andrés Hurtado "Chibolín". After completing acting projects in Peru, Hurtado attended the New York Film Academy.

Early life
Hurtado began working as a professional actor as a child in a stage play named The Little Mermaid at the Teatro Mocha Graña at the age of 6 years old.  Other theatre productions followed including the musical Annie. At 11 years old, she was offered her first on screen acting job in the film 'Que será de mi'. Hurtado performed along with her father Andrés Hurtado “Chibolín” at the Montecarlo circus for 4 seasons during early childhood. She appeared in several more stage performances and also performed as a clown before being selected for a role in the TV show Mi Amor, el Wachimán.

Filmography

References

External links

21st-century Peruvian actresses
Peruvian film actresses
People from Lima
Peruvian female dancers
Peruvian female models
Living people
1988 births
Peruvian television actresses
Peruvian child actresses
Actresses from Lima